The Gao Brothers are two Chinese artists named Zhen (born 1956) and Qiang Gao (born 1962) from Jinan, in the province of Shandong (located in the north east of China).

Their works tend to be charged with political and social nuances, including their recurring use of Mao's image. Gao Zhen, the elder of the brothers, explained through an interpreter that "1968 was a crucial moment in the Cultural revolution, where political 'cleaning'  took place. Our father, a simple laborer was thrown into jail. We still don’t know if he actually committed suicide as the authorities told us or if he was killed during his incarceration". At that time, Gao Zhen was 12 years old and Gao Qiang was 6.

A retrospective of their work, "Gao Brothers : Grandeur and Catharsis", was organized by the Kemper Museum from September 17, 2010, to 2011, January 2. A brief presentation of their work shows the multifaceted nature of their art: the brothers combine diverse mediums such as painting, sculpture, performance, and photography. They currently work in the artists district called 798 Art Zone in the Dashanzi Art District, and their work is internationally recognized.

Biography 
Both brothers were introduced to Chinese traditional art before they began their college studies. The older brother graduated from Shandong Academy of Fine Arts and the younger brother from Qufu Normal University (Qufu is said to be the hometown of the thinker, educator and politician Confucius).

The notion of "brotherhood", inspired by their own relationship, is at times embedded in their works as a message for all humanity. In 2002, the Gao Brothers left Shandong to settle in Beijing.

Their art is protean, they refuse to be limited to only one medium, what is most important is the message at hand they are attempting to convey through their work.

Art

Sculptures

Midnight Mass 
The Gao Brothers started their career in 1989 via a collective exhibition organized at the National Art Museum of China (NAMOC)  where they exhibited their piece Midnight Mass, an inflatable installation representing a hermaphrodite sexual organ measuring 4 meters high. Midnight Mass borrows from surrealism the technique of the body's fragmentation and the notion of the "Anatomy of desire" from Hans Bellmer. However, both the material used (inflatable plastic) and the dimensions of the work bring it into the realm of contemporary art.

Miss Mao 
With her large breasts and her long nose, Miss Mao, Mao Zedong's monumental icon, appears as a hybridization of Minnie and Pinocchio. She is a grotesque image of a monstrous mother figure and a liar. As Claude Hudelot and Guy Gallice, show in their book, The Mao, the abundant iconography of Mao spans 60 years of Chinese folk art, depicting tirelessly the images of worship of the Great Helmsman. Given the escalation of propaganda and the power of the image used in advertising, artists are left with a natural choice to divert and distort these images, often in an exaggerated and grotesque manner.

The Execution of Christ 
In 2009, the Gao Brothers turned towards working with bronze. The execution of Christ consists of bronze statues of seven soldiers shooting Christ. The sculpture of Mao with a gun was made in 1964, April 28. This parable refers to the concept developed by Nicolas Bourriaud known as "alter-modernity" Bourriaud, that begins with the idea that today's artists live in a globalized culture that should be used not to deny their individuality but to create a new modernity - one made of openness and intercultural exchange. The execution of Christ illustrates this concept as it combines two fundamentally different cultures while preserving one another.

Paintings

If time reversed, Memory – 1989

The firing of Hu Yaobang and his disappearance encouraged the students’ protest at Tiananmen on April 21, 1989 (Tiananmen Square protests of 1989). The demonstrations lasted until the beginning of June, when authorities decided to repress the revolt. The Chinese army repression on June 4, 1989, drew national and international attention. Numerous arrests were made.

The Gao Brothers painted a kind of memorial in honor of the victims. An open hand, a hole at its center representing a bloody wound, now stands in front of Tiananmen Square. Victims of the 1989 repression have been depicted as martyrs sacrificed for the cause of democracy. Across the hand's palm a red Forbidden City appears on a yellow background.

Photography and international reputation

Sense of Space series 
The Gao brother's series Sense of Space  depicts the authors and other anonymous models, naked, locked in boxes labeled with titles such as "Prayer", "Waiting", "Anxiety" and "Pain". Contorted bodies attempt to enter into boxes too small for them.

Performances

From 2000: The Hug
For about ten years, the Gao Brothers have organized performances around the idea of hugging, a 15-minute couple embrace and then a collective embrace of 5 minutes occurs.  Some models are dressed, others are naked. Since 2000, nearly 150 people, meeting each other for the first time through this experience, have embraced each other through organized meetings of this sort.

References

Further reading 
 Gao Brothers, Portraits, China  Art archives and Warehouse, 2010.
 GROSS, Sylvia Maria, Interview of The Gao Brothers, KCUR-FM, exhibition at the Kemper museum in September 2010, http://www.publicbroadcasting.net/kcur/arts.artsmain?action=viewArticle&sid=16&pid=77&id=1701642
 The Gao Brothers, Duncan Miller Gallery, 2010.
 The Gao brothers, Grandeur & catharsis, Kemper museum of contemporary art, 2010.
 "In China, a Headless Mao Is a Game of Cat and Mouse", in The New York Times, October 5, 2009
 Gao brothers, Benamou Gallery, Paris, 2007.
 Un autre monde, les frères Gao, Les rencontres d’Arles, 2007
 GOLD, "Artist brothers test Chinese boundaries", in Los Angeles Times, May 20, 2005.
 Florent Villard, Critique de la vie quotidienne en Chine à l'aube du XXIe siècle avec les Gao Brothers, Paris, L'Harmattan, 2015.

External links 
 Site des Gao Brothers

Artists from Jinan
Chinese contemporary artists